James Low Milne (24 January 1911 – 13 December 1997) was a Scottish football player and manager.

Playing career
Born in Dundee, Milne played local non-league football before joining Dundee United in 1931. The following year he moved to England when he joined Preston North End.

Management career
He managed Preston North End from 1961 to 1968 and Wigan Athletic from 1946 to 1947 as well as Morecambe from 1947–48.

Personal life
Jimmy is the father of Gordon Milne, who also went on to be a professional footballer and manager.

External links

1911 births
Footballers from Dundee
1997 deaths
Scottish footballers
Association football midfielders
Dundee United F.C. players
Preston North End F.C. players
Wigan Athletic F.C. players
Morecambe F.C. players
Scottish football managers
Wigan Athletic F.C. managers
Preston North End F.C. managers
Morecambe F.C. managers
English Football League players
English Football League managers
FA Cup Final players